"The Wages of Sin" was the twelfth episode of the second series of the British television series, Upstairs, Downstairs. The episode is set in 1910.

Cast

Guest cast
 Nicola Pagett (Elizabeth Kirbridge) 
 Donald Burton (Julius Karekin)
 Mairhi Russell (Mademoiselle Jeanette)

Plot
Sarah and Thomas Watkins, who had previously been employed as the valet of Lawrence Kirbridge, fall in love, resulting in Sarah becoming pregnant again. They marry.

References

Upstairs, Downstairs (series 2) episodes
1973 British television episodes
Fiction set in 1907